The Triplets are three fictional characters (Anna, Teresa and Helena) created by Spanish  illustrator Roser Capdevila.

The Triplets were created in 1983, based on Capdevila's own daughters, three actual triplets born in 1969. The stories were immediately successful and began publishing in many countries. In 1985 a new character, the "Bored Witch" (La Bruixa Avorrida) was added to the plots to form a collection of classical stories, "The Triplets and (...)".

In 1994, television producer Cromosoma and the Catalan TV corporation Televisió de Catalunya adapted the stories to make an animated series based on the books. It became very successful and profitable and led to the production of a second series with the Bored Witch as the main character, together with France 3, Canal J and Storimages.

By 2004, The Triplets series consisted of 104 episodes, while The Bored Witch reached 52. They have been translated to 35 different languages and have been shown in 158 countries or territories. A spin-off series was also made, titled The Baby Triplets.

In October 2020, it was announced that the series will receive a reboot that will focus 20 years after the first one ended.

Plot 
The plots of the triplet sisters follow a definite pattern. Sometimes they play some prank or manage to annoy the Bored Witch, and, to punish them, she sends them into a classic tale, legend, or children's or adult's (such as Frankenstein or The Phantom of the Opera) literary work. The main structure of the classic remains, but some twists (often hilarious anachronisms such as showing The forty thieves getting distracted from robbing a house by a camel race on TV or Dr. Frankenstein as a veterinarian) are introduced to favor each plot and define the sisters' personalities.

Characters
Teresa (Tessa in the English dub) - She wears the pink ribbon. She is the most adventurous triplet and comes up with the most ambitious ideas, but she's not necessarily the leader.

Anna (Annie in the English dub) - She wears the blue ribbon. She's laid-back and more peaceful than her sisters. She's also quite curious. Anna tends to be a bit romantic at times.

Helena (Nellie in the English dub) - She wears the green ribbon. She has the sweetest demeanor of the triplets. She also has a love for food and sweets, which sometimes leads to trouble.

The Bored Witch - She is an overweight witch who is always bored, despite having great magical powers. She serves as a kind of unofficial day sitter for the triplets, but when they start acting disorderly, she uses her magic to send the girls into stories. No matter what, she never uses magic to directly hinder the girls in their adventures, although tends to join forces with every story's antagonist. Despite her role of antagonist, she is not an evil character and always keeps her word to return the girls to their land.

Episodes

The Triplets find themselves involved in a different classic story in each chapter.

Season 1 (1996-1999)
Chapter 1: Hop o' My Thumb
Chapter 2: Snow White
Chapter 3: Cinderella
Chapter 4: Ali Baba
Chapter 5: Fearless John
Chapter 6: The Tin Soldier
Chapter 7: The Princess and the Pea
Chapter 8: The Pied Piper of Hamelin
Chapter 9: Bluebeard
Chapter 10: Hansel and Gretel
Chapter 11: The Three Little Pigs
Chapter 12: The Emperor's New Clothes
Chapter 13: Little Red Riding Hood
Chapter 14: The Ugly Duckling
Chapter 15: Aladdin
Chapter 16: The Seven Samurai
Chapter 17: The Musicians of Bremen
Chapter 18: The Legend of the Red Dragon
Chapter 19: Sleeping Beauty
Chapter 20: Puss in Boots
Chapter 21: Don Quixote
Chapter 22: Pinocchio
Chapter 23: Saint George
Chapter 24: The Thieves of Baghdad
Chapter 25: Jack and the Beanstalk
Chapter 26: Knights of the Round Table
Chapter 27: The Wizard of Oz
Chapter 28: The Treasure Island
Chapter 29: Sandokan
Chapter 30: Oliver Twist
Chapter 31: Helen of Troy
Chapter 32: Robinson Crusoe
Chapter 33: Robin Hood
Chapter 34: Atlantis
Chapter 35: The Jungle Book
Chapter 36: Journey to the Center of the Earth
Chapter 37: Merlin
Chapter 38: Buffalo Bill
Chapter 39: The Journies of Ulysses
Chapter 40: Romeo and Juliet
Chapter 41: King Kong
Chapter 42: Tarzan
Chapter 43: Leonardo da Vinci
Chapter 44: The Three Musketeers
Chapter 45: Cleopatra
Chapter 46: Christopher Columbus
Chapter 47: The Cro-Magnon man
Chapter 48: The Wolf and the Seven Kids
Chapter 49: King Solomon's Mines
Chapter 50: The Man from Mayapan
Chapter 51: Marco Polo
Chapter 52: Frankenstein
Chapter 53: 20,000 Leagues Under the Sea
Chapter 54: Kim of India
Chapter 55: Amadeus
Chapter 56: Santa Claus
Chapter 57: In the Circus
Chapter 58: In Outer Space
Chapter 59: White Fang
Chapter 60: Tom Sawyer
Chapter 61: The Crystal Balalaika
Chapter 62: Phantom of the Opera
Chapter 63: Around the World in Eighty Days
Chapter 64: Moby-Dick
Chapter 65: In Africa

Season 2 (2003)
Chapter 66: The Magic Flute
Chapter 67: The Little Mouse who Swept the Little House
Chapter 68: Patufet
Chapter 69: The Drummer from Bruc
Chapter 70: Gaudi’s Studio
Chapter 71: The Phantoms of La Pedrera
Chapter 72: Sherlock Holmes
Chapter 73: The Cicada and the Ant
Chapter 74: The Milkmaid
Chapter 75: Cyrano de Bergerac
Chapter 76: The World of Cinema
Chapter 77: Geronimo
Chapter 78: On Everest
Chapter 79: Vincent van Gogh
Chapter 80: Gutenberg’s Printing Press
Chapter 81: The Magical Bagpipe
Chapter 82: Xuroi’s Cave
Chapter 83: The Steam Engine
Chapter 84: Thor the Viking
Chapter 85: Velázquez
Chapter 86: The Valiant Little Tailor
Chapter 87: Beauty and the Beast
Chapter 88: William Tell
Chapter 89: Captains Courageous
Chapter 90: Zeila the Gazelle
Chapter 91: The Little Mermaid
Chapter 92: The Rosemary Flower
Chapter 93: Dr. Jekyll and Mr. Hyde
Chapter 94: The Prince and the Pauper
Chapter 95: Tristan and Isolde
Chapter 96: The Snow Queen
Chapter 97: Agatha Christie
Chapter 98: The Happy Prince
Chapter 99: Tutankhamon
Chapter 100: The Time Machine
Chapter 101: The Lady Pirates
Chapter 102: Holet the Goblin
Chapter 103: The Invisible Man
Chapter 104: The Birthday Party

Movie: The Triplets and the Riddle of Don Quixote (2005)

Voice actors

References

External links

Literary characters introduced in 1983
1997 Spanish television series debuts
2003 Spanish television series endings
1990s animated television series
2000s animated television series
Teletoon original programming
Catalan-language literature
Children's television characters
Female characters in literature
Characters in children's literature
Spanish children's animated adventure television series
Spanish children's animated comedy television series
Television shows based on children's books
Television shows based on fairy tales
Literature based on fairy tales
Animated television series about sisters
Animated television series about children
Spanish children's animated television series
Fictional Spanish people